I Love Men is a 1984 studio album by Eartha Kitt, her first album recorded for 14 years. The album was recorded in New York at the Power Station. Produced by French record producer Jacques Morali, who had previously produced recordings by the Village People and The Ritchie Family. This album features Kitt performing Euro disco, dance tracks. The first single released from the album "Where Is My Man" had been previously released in 1983 and had returned Kitt to the UK charts after an absence of 28 years. The single reached #36 after entering the chart in November 1983 and charted in several European countries. and also made the Top 10 of the US Billboard dance chart, where it reached #7.
The title track "I Love Men" was issued as the second single and this charted in the UK at #50 in the summer of 1984. The success of this album led to a new collaboration between Kitt and Jacques Morali in 1985 when they recorded two more tracks, "I Don't Care" and "This Is My Life"; the latter also went on to chart in the UK in 1986 at #73. These tracks were also added to later re-issues of the original album.

Track listing
All tracks credited to: Jacques Morali, Fred Zarr and Bruce Vilanch
Side One:
"I Love Men" – 7:03
"Arabian Song" – 5:48
"Sugar Daddy" – 6:37
Side Two:
"La Grande Vie" – 5:41
"Tonite" – 5:04
"Where Is My Man" (Euromix) – 10:08

CD bonus tracks
"I Don't Care" – 6:05
"This Is My Life" – 5:34

Personnel
 Jacques Morali – Producer
 Henri Belolo – Executive producer
 Fred Zarr – Arranger
 Kenn Duncan – Photography
 Engineered and Mixed by B. Scheniman and D. Greenberg

Performance
Eartha Kitt – vocals
 Fred Zarr – Synthesizers and Keyboards
 Ira Siegel – Guitar
 Bill Scheniman – Acoustic guitar
 Bashiri Johnson – Percussion
 Neil Jason – Bass guitar
 Maeretha Stewart, Ullanda McCullough, Diane Wilson, Yvonne Lewis – Backing vocals

Weekly charts

References

Eartha Kitt albums
1984 albums
Disco albums by American artists